KVVP (105.7 FM, "Today's Country 105.7") is a radio station broadcasting a country music format. Licensed to Leesville, Louisiana, United States, the station serves the area surrounding Vernon Parish and surrounding areas in West Central Louisiana.  The station is currently owned by Stannard Broadcasting Inc.

References

External links

Radio stations in Louisiana
Country radio stations in the United States